Rüdiger Butte (17 May 1949, Lüthorst, Germany – 26 April 2013, Hamelin) was a German detective and politician (SPD) who was councillor of the district of Hamelin-Pyrmont and previously Director of the State Office of Criminal Investigation of Lower Saxony until his violent death.

Death
On 26 April 2013, Butte was shot in front of the district building.

References

1949 births
2013 deaths
Deaths by firearm in Germany
German murder victims
People murdered in Germany
German police officers
2013 murders in Germany